This is a list of castles in Slovakia. This list includes palaces, citadels and manor houses.

These Slovak words translate as follows:
hrad, hrádok - castle
zámok - correctly: château, commonly translated as castle
pevnosť - fortress, citadel
kaštieľ - mansion or manor house

Preserved castles

Castle ruins

See also
 List of castles in Europe
 List of castles

External links
 List of Slovak castles at castles.sk
 Slovak castles at slovenskehrady.sk
 Slovak Castles at Slovak Heritage Live
 Slovak castles and churches at heartofeurope.co.uk

Slovakia
Castles
Slovakia
Castles